Francisco Luiz Sibut Gomide (born 30 November 1945 in Curitiba) is an engineer, economist and politician.

He was Minister of Mines and Energy of Brazil during the government of President Fernando Henrique Cardoso, from 3 April to 31 December 2002.

External links
Ministry of Mines and Energy of Brazil

1945 births
Living people
Politicians from Curitiba
Energy ministers of Brazil